The Maryland Department of Agriculture (MDA) is a state agency of Maryland. Its headquarters are in the Parole census-designated place in unincorporated Anne Arundel County, near Annapolis. The Department was established in 1972.

, the Secretary of the department is Kevin Atticks, appointed by Governor Wes Moore.  He was preceded in this position by Joseph Bartenfelder.

The Department provides various initiatives to promote local agriculture, such as the "True Blue Maryland Crab Meat" ranking which allows local restaurants to certify restaurants that are serving local crabmeat rather than something imported from out of state.

References

External links

 Maryland Department of Agriculture
 Department of Agriculture-Maryland Manual On-Line
 State Board of Agriculture Records at the University of Maryland Libraries. This board was a precursor to the MDA, established in 1916 and abolished with the creation of the MDA. 
Livestock Sanitary Board records at the University of Maryland Libraries. This board was a precursor to the MDA, established in 1889 and reorganized under the State Board of Agriculture in 1916. 

 
State departments of agriculture of the United States
1972 establishments in Maryland